Seán Kenny (born 1 October 1942) is an Irish former Labour Party politician who served as a Teachta Dála (TD) for the Dublin North-East constituency from 1992 to 1997 and 2011 to 2016. He also served as Lord Mayor of Dublin from 1991 to 1992.

A former executive officer in CIÉ, Kenny was elected to Dáil Éireann for Dublin North-East during the swing to Labour in the 1992 general election. During his time in the Dáil, he was a member of the Forum for Peace and Reconciliation and served as Chairman of the Social Affairs Committee.

Like many other Labour TDs elected in 1992, he lost his seat at the 1997 general election. Kenny had previously unsuccessfully contested every general election from 1981 to 1989. He did not contest the 2002 general election or the 2007 general election.

From 1979 to 2011, he was a member of Dublin City Council as a local councillor for Donaghmede. He was Lord Mayor of Dublin from 1991 to 1992.

Kenny was re-elected to Dáil Éireann for Dublin North-East at the 2011 general election, but did not contest the 2016 general election.

References

External links

 

1942 births
Living people
Labour Party (Ireland) TDs
People from Raheny
Lord Mayors of Dublin
Members of the 27th Dáil
Members of the 31st Dáil
Politicians from County Galway
People educated at Garbally College